Roy Alan Chipolina (born 20 January 1983) is a Gibraltarian footballer who plays as a defender for Gibraltar Premier Division side Lincoln Red Imps and the Gibraltar national team, for which he serves as captain.

Club career
Chipolina has played for Gibraltar Premier Division side Lincoln Red Imps since 2006. He became the first Gibraltarian, and oldest player, to score in the fledgling UEFA Europa Conference League when he scored in a 4–1 defeat to Slovan Bratislava on 4 November 2021.

International career
Chipolina made his international debut with the Gibraltar national team on 18 November 2013 in a 0–0 home draw with Slovakia, Gibraltar's first game since being admitted to UEFA. Chipolina scored Gibraltar's first UEFA goal, in their second official game, on 1 March 2014 against the Faroe Islands at Victoria Stadium, which they lost 4–1.

Personal life
Chipolina was born in Enfield, North London, but moved to Gibraltar at age 4. He moved back to England aged 12, and attended Southgate School, where he featured heavily for the school football team and their offshoot, the Southgate Saints. During his time at Southgate, he had a trial period of three months at Luton Town. He moved back to Gibraltar at age 18. Chipolina works as a Customs Officer in Gibraltar.

Roy is a cousin of other Gibraltarian footballers: Joseph (born 1987) and Kenneth (born 1994).

Career statistics

International

Scores and results list Gibraltar's goal tally first, score column indicates score after each Chipolina goal.

Honours
Lincoln Red Imps
 Gibraltar Premier Division (15): 2006–07, 2007–08, 2008–09, 2009–10, 2010–11, 2011–12, 2012–13, 2013–14, 2014–15, 2015–16, 2017–18, 2018–19, 2020–21, 2021–22, 2022–23
Rock Cup (10): 2006–07, 2007–08, 2008–09, 2009–10, 2010–11, 2014, 2015, 2016, 2021, 2021–22
 Pepe Reyes Cup (9): 2007, 2008, 2009, 2010, 2011, 2014, 2015, 2017, 2022
 Gibraltar League Senior Cup (5): 2006–07, 2007–08, 2010–11, 2011–12, 2013–14

References

External links

 
 
 

1983 births
Living people
Gibraltarian footballers
Gibraltar international footballers
Association football defenders
Lynx F.C. players
Lincoln Red Imps F.C. players
Footballers from Enfield, London
Gibraltar Premier Division players
Gibraltar pre-UEFA international footballers
Gibraltar National League players
English footballers